Virginia Blanco Tardío (18 April 1916 - 23 July 1990) was a Bolivian Roman Catholic from Cochabamba and served as a member of Catholic Action. She was a well-known catechist and educator in addition to opening a range of different places to cater to the needs of the poor. Blanco was also awarded the Pro Ecclesia et Pontifice award in 1975 after Pope Paul VI acknowledged her work with the Catholic Action movement.

Blanco's beatification cause has commenced and under Pope John Paul II on 23 October 2000 became known as a Servant of God. She was proclaimed to be venerable in 2015 after Pope Francis recognized her life of heroic virtue.

Life
Virginia Blanco Tardío was born on 18 April 1916 in Cochabamba as the second of four daughters of Luis Pio Blanco Unzueta (d. 1934) and Daria Tardío Quiroga; her parents married in 1906. Her siblings were: Maria Luisa Blanco Tardío, Alicia Blanco Tardío and Maria Teresa Sarabia.

Blanco thought about becoming a nun but decided against it due to the demanding life it would entail as well as her health. This thought came about around the time of her father's death when she was eighteen.

She earned her high school degree in the humanities at the College of the Handmaids of the Sacred Heart of Jesus which she remained tied to as a member of the Marian Congregation of Alumnae. Blanco was studious and was known for her extensive culture - she possessed vast knowledge in biblical and theological matter and went on to become a reputable teacher and catechist. She educated the children of farm workers. She earned the title of Professor of Religion at the age of 32; she taught religion in several public schools for a total of four decades while for a decade worked as an unpaid volunteer.

In 1932 she joined Catholic Action. Blanco would serve as the President of the Women's Youth of the Catholic Action from 1941 until 1961 when she was made the Diocesan President of Association of Women of Catholic Action which she held until her death. Blanco founded an "Economic Kitchen" in 1954 for the poor and also established the "Prayer and Friendship Group" in 1962 - the group's counsel was the Jesuit priest Julián Sayos. She founded a center that was to provide medical services to those who could not afford healthcare. In addition she also aided children in their preparation for the sacraments and on more than one occasion baptized children that were in danger of death.

Blanco met Pope Pius XII in 1950 in Rome who dubbed her the "Apostle of Catholic Action" and encouraged her work.

She received the Pro Ecclesia et Pontifice award in December 1965 after Pope Paul VI recognized her significant contribution to evangelism and her work with the Catholic Action movement. On 8 December 1977 she founded the "Comedores Sociales" - now a part of "Policlinico Rosario" - which opened to serve the needs of the poor; following her death her sister Maria Teresa Sarabia continued this work. She received the Eucharist from Pope John Paul II at a Mass during his apostolic visit to the nation on 11 May 1988.

Blanco's sight began to fail towards the end of the 1980s and she died due to cardiac arrest in the night of 23 July 1990; she had made her final confession and received her final Communion on 22 July.

Lineage
Her paternal grandparents were Benjamín Blanco Unzueta and Justina Unzueta de Soto. Her paternal uncle was Juan Blanco Unzueta who was the sole sibling of Blanco's father. Her paternal great-grandparents - from Benjamín - was Pío Blanco Heredia - who had one brother - and Magdalena Unzueta i Canals; the two married in 1829 and their sole child was Blanco's grandfather.

Her paternal great-great grandparents - from Pío - were Francisco Xavier Gutiérrez Blanco de Bustamante (1762-1832) and María Fernandez de Heredia i Terrazas (d. 1848); the two married in 1791. Her paternal great-great-great grandparents - from Francisco - were Manuel Valentín Gutiérrez de Celis (d. 1794) and Juana Blanco de Bustamante i Uribe (b. 1717); the two married in 1761 and had one child which was Blanco's great-great grandfather.

Her great-great-great grandmother Juana's parents were Pedro de Uribe i Salazar and Manuela Blanco de Bustamante Pereira (b. 1696); the pair had one child after their marriage in 1707. Manuela's parents were Sebastián de Riglos Basabe and Juana Blanco de Bustamante de la Vega (1666-1747) and the two had one child being Juana; she married Sebastían in 1682 but re-married in 1695 after the latter's death to Manuel Pereira de Castro e Silva. Juana Blanco de Bustamante de la Vega's parents were Martín Blanco de Bustamante i Pérez (1640-1720) and María de la Vega i Noriega (b. 1647). Juana had seven siblings: five sisters and two brothers. Blanco's great-great-great grandfather Manuel's parents were Juan Blanco de Bustamante and María Pérez Velarde.

Blanco is also related to the Bolivian President Carlos Blanco Galindo.

Beatification process

The beatification process commenced on 23 October 2000 under Pope John Paul II when the Congregation for the Causes of Saints declared "nihil obstat" ('nothing against') to the cause and granted the title of Servant of God upon her. The diocesan process commenced on 31 January 2001 - in which the Salesian Archbishop of Cochabamba Tito Solari Capellari inaugurated - and closed on 16 February 2005. Father Miguel Manzanera served as the Chief Judge and oversaw the examination of 45 witnesses who knew Blanco. The C.C.S. validated this process in Rome on 19 January 2007.

The postulation submitted the Positio to the C.C.S. in 2013 for further investigation into the cause while theologians voiced their approval to the contents of the Positio in a meeting on 5 June 2014. The C.C.S. did likewise in 2014 before passing it to the pope for his final approval. Pope Francis proclaimed Blanco to be Venerable on 22 January 2015 after confirming that she had indeed lived a model life of heroic virtue.

The process for an alleged miracle attributed to her - and required for her beatification - was investigated from 10 March 2016 until 3 June 2016.

The current postulator that is assigned to the cause is the Jesuit Anton Witwer. The first and previous postulator was Salvador Sanchis.

References

External links
Hagiography Circle
Saints SQPN

1916 births
1990 deaths
20th-century venerated Christians
20th-century Bolivian people
Bolivian Roman Catholics
People from Cochabamba
Venerated Catholics by Pope Francis